Staraya Maskara (İśke Masqarı) is a rural locality (a village) in Belyankovsky Selsoviet, Belokataysky District, Bashkortostan, Russia. The population was 120 as of 2010. There are 4 streets.

Geography 
Staraya Maskara is located 41 km northeast of Novobelokatay (the district's administrative centre) by road. Pervomaysky is the nearest rural locality.

References 

Rural localities in Belokataysky District